Veshnavah (also Romanized as Vashnaveh, Veshnaveh, and Veshnoweh; also known as Veshnāven) is a village in Fordu Rural District, Kahak District, Qom County, Qom Province, Iran. At the 2006 census, its population was 405, in 138 families.

References 

Populated places in Qom Province